Elinor "Elle" Purrier St. Pierre (born February 20, 1995) is an American track and field athlete who specializes in middle-distance running and long-distance running.  In 2022, she earned her first global medal, winning silver in the women's 3000 metres at the 2022 World Indoor Championships in Belgrade.

Purrier represented the United States at the 2019 World Athletics Championships, competing in the women's 5000 meters. On February 8, 2020, she set the American record for the indoor mile, with a time of 4:16.85 at the Millrose Games. On February 13, 2021, she ran a time of 9:10.28 to break the American indoor two-mile record. The time was also lower than the outdoor two-mile record.

Early life
Elle Purrier St. Pierre grew up milking thirty dairy cows each morning before school.

Purrier attended Richford High School as a sixteen-time Vermont Principals' Association state Division IV champion. She won the 2012 Nike Cross Nationals (NXN) Northeast Regional championships on the Bowdoin County Park course in Wappingers Falls, New York.

NCAA 
Purrier attended and graduated from the University of New Hampshire, studying nutrition. Representing the New Hampshire Wildcats, she was an NCAA Division I 11-time All-American. At the 2018 USA Outdoor Track and Field Championships, held after she graduated, she finished sixth in the 1500 meters, running a time of 4:09.30. She also won the 2018 NCAA Indoor Track & Field Championships in the women's mile.

Professional 
Purrier signed with New Balance in July 2018. In 2019, she qualified for the IAAF World Athletics Championships in Doha, where she advanced to the 5,000 m final and finished 11th. On February 8, 2020, she set a new United States indoor mile record at the Millrose Games. On February 13, 2021, she ran a time of 9:10.28 to break the American indoor two-mile record.  On June 21, 2021, she finished first in the 2021 U.S Olympic Trials 1500 meter run with a time of 3:58.03, breaking the meet record and setting a personal best.

National championships

International competitions

Personal bests 
All sourced from World Athletics unless otherwise noted. As of February 28, 2023.

Season bests 
All sourced from worldathletics.org unless otherwise noted. As of July 24, 2022.

References

External links

 
 
 
 

American female track and field athletes
American female long-distance runners
American female middle-distance runners
1995 births
Living people
World Athletics Championships athletes for the United States
Sportspeople from Vermont
Track and field athletes from Vermont
People from Franklin County, Vermont
University of New Hampshire alumni
USA Outdoor Track and Field Championships winners
Athletes (track and field) at the 2020 Summer Olympics
New Hampshire Wildcats athletes
Olympic track and field athletes of the United States
World Athletics Indoor Championships medalists
21st-century American women